Vemagiri is a locality in Rajamahendravaram City. Vemagiri is a part of"Greater Rajamahendravaram Municipal Corporation (GRMC)".

References

Villages in Kadiam mandal